Ocinebrina is a genus of sea snails, marine gastropod mollusks in the subfamily Ocenebrinae  of the family Muricidae, the murex snails or rock snails.

Species
The following species are recognised in the genus Ocinebrina:

 Ocinebrina aciculata (Lamarck, 1822)
 Ocinebrina aegeensis Aissaoui, Barco & Oliverio, 2017
 † Ocinebrina ariesiensis (Fontannes, 1879) 
 † Ocinebrina bertai Z. Kovács, 2020 
 † Ocinebrina bicaudata (Borson, 1821) 
 †Ocinebrina carvalhoi (Cox, 1936)
 †Ocinebrina coelata (Dujardin, 1837)
 † Ocinebrina concerpta (Bellardi, 1873) 
 † Ocinebrina confluens (Eichwald, 1853) 
 Ocinebrina corallina (Scacchi, 1836)
 Ocinebrina corallinoides Pallary, 1912
 † Ocinebrina crassilabiata (Hilber, 1879) 
 † Ocinebrina dertonensis (Bellardi, 1873) 
 †Ocinebrina houarti Landau, Merle, Ceulemans & Van Dingenen, 2019
 † Ocinebrina imbricata (Brocchi, 1814) 
 † Ocinebrina kojumdgievae (Bałuk, 1995) 
 †Ocinebrina landaui Z. Kovács, 2019
 †Ocinebrina lauriatrageae Ceulemans, van Dingenen, Merle & Landau, 2016
 † Ocinebrina perparva Landau, Harzhauser, İslamoğlu & Silva, 2013 
 † Ocinebrina polonica (Bałuk, 1995) 
 † Ocinebrina recognita Bałuk, 2006 
 Ocinebrina reinai Bonomolo & Crocetta, 2012 
 † Ocinebrina renieri (Michelotti, 1847)
 † Ocinebrina scalaris (Brocchi, 1814)
  † Ocinebrina sublavata (Basterot, 1825)

Synonyms
 Ocinebrina barbarensis (Gabb, 1865): synonym of Paciocinebrina barbarensis (Gabb, 1865)
 Ocinebrina blainvillei [sic]: synonym of Muricopsis cristata (Brocchi, 1814) (misspelling of Ocinebrina blainvillii (Payraudeau, 1826))
 Ocinebrina blainvillii (Payraudeau, 1826): synonym of Muricopsis cristata (Brocchi, 1814)
 Ocinebrina buzzurroi Cecalupo & Mariani, 2008: synonym of Ocinebrina corallinoides Pallary, 1912
 Ocinebrina carmelae Cecalupo, Buzzurro & Mariani, 2008: synonym of Ocinebrina piantonii Cecalupo, Buzzurro & Mariani, 2008: synonym of Ocenebra piantonii (Cecalupo, Buzzurro & Mariani, 2008)
 Ocinebrina cellulosa (Conrad, 1846): synonym of Favartia cellulosa (Conrad, 1846)
 Ocinebrina cyclopus Monterosato, 1884: synonym of Ocinebrina edwardsii (Payraudeau, 1826): synonym of Ocenebra edwardsii (Payraudeau, 1826)
 Ocinebrina edwardsi [sic]: synonym of Ocinebrina edwardsii (Payraudeau, 1826): synonym of Ocenebra edwardsii (Payraudeau, 1826) (misspelling of Ocinebrina edwardsii (Payraudeau, 1826))
 Ocinebrina edwardsi (Payraudeau, 1826): synonym of Ocenebra edwardsii (Payraudeau, 1826)
 Ocinebrina edwardsii (Payraudeau, 1826): synonym of Ocenebra edwardsii (Payraudeau, 1826)
 Ocinebrina epiphanea (Dall, 1919): synonym of Paciocinebrina foveolata (Hinds, 1844)
 Ocinebrina erronea (Settepassi, 1977): synonym of Ocinebrina hispidula (Pallary, 1904): synonym of Ocenebra hispidula (Pallary, 1904) (unavailable following ICZN art. 11.4)
 Ocinebrina foveolata (Hinds, 1844): synonym of Paciocinebrina foveolata (Hinds, 1844)
 Ocinebrina gracillima (Stearns, 1871): synonym of Paciocinebrina gracillima (Stearns, 1871)
 Ocinebrina helleri (Brusina, 1865): synonym of Ocenebra helleri (Brusina, 1865)
 Ocinebrina hispidula (Pallary, 1904): synonym of Ocenebra hispidula (Pallary, 1904)
 Ocinebrina hybrida (Aradas & Benoit, 1876): synonym of Ocenebra hybrida (Aradas & Benoit, 1876)
 Ocinebrina ingloria (Crosse, 1865): synonym of Ocenebra ingloria (Crosse, 1865)
 Ocinebrina inordinata (Houart & Abreu, 1994): synonym of Ocenebra inordinata Houart & Abreu, 1994
 Ocinebrina interfossa (Carpenter, 1864): synonym of Paciocinebrina interfossa (Carpenter, 1864)
 Ocinebrina leukos Houart, 2000: synonym of Ocenebra leukos (Houart, 2000) (original combination)
 Ocinebrina lucasi Bozzetti, 2007: synonym of Murexsul planiliratus (Reeve, 1845) (synonym)
 Ocinebrina lurida (Middendorff, 1848): synonym of Paciocinebrina lurida (Middendorff, 1848)
 Ocinebrina miscowichae Pallary, 1920: synonym of Ocenebra miscowichae (Pallary, 1920) (original combination)
 Ocinebrina miscowichi Pallary, 1920: synonym of Ocinebrina miscowichae Pallary, 1920: synonym of Ocenebra miscowichae (Pallary, 1920) (must be emended to miscowichae following ICZN rules)
 Ocinebrina nicolai Monterosato, 1884: synonym of Ocenebra nicolai (Monterosato, 1884) (original combination)
 Ocinebrina paddeui Bonomolo & Buzzurro, 2006: synonym of Ocenebra paddeui (Bonomolo & Buzzurro, 2006) (original combination)
 Ocinebrina perfecta Monterosato in Settepassi, 1977: synonym of Ocinebrina helleri (Brusina, 1865): synonym of Ocenebra helleri (Brusina, 1865) (unavailable following ICZN art. 11.4)
 Ocinebrina piantonii Cecalupo, Buzzurro & Mariani, 2008: synonym of Ocenebra piantonii (Cecalupo, Buzzurro & Mariani, 2008) (original combination)
 Ocinebrina purpuroidea Pallary, 1920: synonym of Ocenebra purpuroidea (Pallary, 1920) (original combination)
 Ocinebrina ruderata Settepassi, 1977: synonym of Ocinebrina edwardsii (Payraudeau, 1826): synonym of Ocenebra edwardsii (Payraudeau, 1826) (not available, published in a work which does not consistently use binomial nomenclature (ICZN art. 11.4))
 Ocinebrina scalaropsis Settepassi, 1977: synonym of Ocinebrina aciculata (Lamarck, 1822) (unavailable following ICZN art. 11.4)
 Ocinebrina scaloropsis Settepassi, 1977: synonym of Ocinebrina edwardsii (Payraudeau, 1826): synonym of Ocenebra edwardsii (Payraudeau, 1826) (not available, published in a work which does not consistently use binomial nomenclature (ICZN art. 11.4))
 Ocinebrina sclera (Dall, 1919): synonym of Paciocinebrina sclera (Dall, 1919)
 Ocinebrina seftoni (Chace, 1958): synonym of Paciocinebrina seftoni (Chace, 1958)
 † Ocinebrina squamulifera (Carpenter, 1869): synonym of † Paciocinebrina squamulifera (Carpenter, 1869) 
 Ocinebrina titii (Stossich, 1865): synonym of Ocinebrina corallina (Scacchi, 1836)

References

External links
 Jousseaume, F. P. (1880). Division méthodique de la famille des Purpuridés. Le Naturaliste. 2(42): 335-338
 Bucquoy E., Dautzenberg P. & Dollfus G. (1882-1886). Les mollusques marins du Roussillon. Tome Ier. Gastropodes. Paris: Baillière & fils. 570 pp., 66 pls.
 Barco, A.; Aissaoui, C.; Houart, R.; Bonomolo, G.; Crocetta, F. & Oliverio, M. (2018). Revision of the Ocinebrina aciculata species complex (Mollusca: Gastropoda: Muricidae) in the northeastern Atlantic Ocean and Mediterranean Sea. Journal of Molluscan Studies. 84 (1): 19-29
 Crocetta, F.; Bonomolo, G.; Albano, P. G.; Barco, A.; Houart, R.; Oliverio, M. (2012). The status of the northeastern Atlantic and Mediterranean small mussel drills of the Ocinebrina aciculata complex (Mollusca: Gastropoda: Muricidae), with the description of a new species. Scientia Marina. 76(1): 177-189
 Barco, A.; Houart, R.; Bonomolo, G.; Crocetta, F.; Oliverio, M. (2013). Molecular data reveal cryptic lineages within the northeastern Atlantic and Mediterranean small mussel drills of the Ocinebrina edwardsii complex (Mollusca: Gastropoda: Muricidae. Zoological Journal of the Linnean Society. 169 (2): 389-407
 Barco, A.; Herbert, G.; Houart, R.; Fassio, G. & Oliverio, M. (2017). A molecular phylogenetic framework for the subfamily Ocenebrinae (Gastropoda, Muricidae). Zoologica Scripta. 46 (3): 322-335

Ocenebrinae